Slavi Zhekov (born 21 August 1976) is a former Bulgarian footballer who played as a midfielder.

Honours

Club
 Cherno More
 Bulgarian Cup:
 Runner-up: 2005-06
 Beroe
 Bulgarian Cup:
 Winner: 2009-10

External links
 Profile at beroe.eu

1976 births
Association football midfielders
Bulgarian footballers
FC Chernomorets Burgas players
First Professional Football League (Bulgaria) players
Living people
PFC Beroe Stara Zagora players
PFC Cherno More Varna players
Sportspeople from Stara Zagora